Lady Boringdon may refer to:

 Theresa Parker (1745–1775), English noblewoman known as Lady Boringdon
 Augusta Fane (1786–1871), English noblewoman known as Lady Boringdon whilst married to John Parker, 1st Earl of Morley (known as 2nd Baron Boringdon  from 1788–1815)
 Lady Boringdon (1804 ship), a British ship launched in 1804